This is a list of Buddhist members of the United States Congress.

, only three Buddhists have ever been elected to Congress, the first being both Mazie Hirono and Hank Johnson in 2007. One Buddhist currently serves in the House of Representatives and one Buddhist serves in the Senate.

Senate

House of Representatives

See also
 List of Hindu members of the United States Congress
 List of Jewish members of the United States Congress
 List of Mormon members of the United States Congress
 List of Muslim members of the United States Congress
 List of Quaker members of the United States Congress
 List of Asian Americans and Pacific Islands Americans in the United States Congress

References

Lists of members of the United States Congress